Adriano Gomes de Lima (born 21 June 1973) is a Brazilian Paralympic swimmer who competes in international elite competitions. He is an eleven-time Parapan American Games champion, won nine Paralympic medals and is also nine-time World medalist. Lima became a paraplegic after falling off a roof while working at a construction site aged seventeen.

References

1973 births
Living people
People from Natal, Rio Grande do Norte
Paralympic swimmers of Brazil
Swimmers at the 1996 Summer Paralympics
Swimmers at the 2000 Summer Paralympics
Swimmers at the 2004 Summer Paralympics
Swimmers at the 2008 Summer Paralympics
Swimmers at the 2012 Summer Paralympics
Swimmers at the 2016 Summer Paralympics
Medalists at the 1996 Summer Paralympics
Medalists at the 2000 Summer Paralympics
Medalists at the 2004 Summer Paralympics
Medalists at the 2008 Summer Paralympics
Medalists at the 2003 Parapan American Games
Medalists at the 2007 Parapan American Games
Medalists at the 2011 Parapan American Games
Brazilian male freestyle swimmers
Brazilian male medley swimmers
S6-classified Paralympic swimmers
Sportspeople from Rio Grande do Norte